Nikola Kirilov Georgiyev (born 16 December 1982) is a former Russian professional football player.

Club career
He played in the Kazakhstan Premier League for FC Zhenis in 2004.

References

External links
 Profile by Sportbox

1982 births
Russian people of Bulgarian descent
People from Stary Oskol
Living people
Russian footballers
Association football forwards
FC Volga Nizhny Novgorod players
FC Elista players
FC Zhenis Astana players
FC Sever Murmansk players
Kazakhstan Premier League players
Russian expatriate footballers
Expatriate footballers in Kazakhstan
Russian expatriate sportspeople in Kazakhstan
Sportspeople from Belgorod Oblast